Lapphyttan or Lapphyttejarn in Norberg Municipality, Sweden, may be regarded as the type site for the Medieval Blast Furnace.  Its date is probably between 1150 and 1350.  It produced cast iron, which was then fined to make ferritic wrought iron cake or bun-like blooms. These were then cut into lumps for trade. It is thought that they correspond to the iron pieces known as osmonds.  Osmonds occur in English Customs records in the 1250s and seem to be alluded to in a commercial treaty with Novgorod in 1203. Lapphyttan is a part of Ecomuseum Bergslagen.

Furnaces of this type have also been identified in Mark (Märkische Sauerland) in Westphalia and north of the Schwäbische Alb both in Germany.

Further reading
 N. Björkenstam, 'The Blast Furnace in Europe during the Medieval Times: part of a new system for producing wrought iron' and M. Kempa and Ü. Yalçin, 'Medieval Iron Smelting in southern Germany: early evidence of pig iron' both in G. Magnusson (ed.), The importance of Ironmaking: Technical Innovation and Social Change: papers presented at the Norberg conference 1995 I (Jernkontoret, Stockholm 1995)
 Modin, H., Modin, S., and Serning, I. Iron from Lapphyttan. A metallographic investigation and guide with archaeological comments. (Meritforlaget, Johanneshov) 1985.

External links
 Järnet på Lapphyttan 
 

Economic history of Sweden
Archaeological sites in Sweden
Archaeological type sites
Geography of Västmanland County